The 2011–12 Sydney Blue Sox season will be the second season for the team. As was the case for the previous season, the Blue Sox will compete in the Australian Baseball League (ABL) with the other five foundation teams, and will again play its home games at Blacktown International Sportspark Sydney. The team will be defending its record from the 2010–11 season where it had the best win–loss record during the regular season.

Offseason 
In July 2011, David Welch announced his retirement from professional baseball. During the Blue Sox' inaugural season, he won the league's Pitcher of the Year award, and threw the first no-hitter in the league's history during the preliminary final series against the Adelaide Bite, accounting for the team's only win during the postseason.

Also in July, an announcement was made that the name of the sporting complex the Blue Sox use for home games was changed from Blacktown Olympic Park to Blacktown International Sportspark Sydney. In other national sporting competitions, the complex serves as the training base for the Greater Western Sydney Giants team in the Australian Football League.

Regular season

Standings

Record vs opponents

Game log 

|- bgcolor=#bbffbb
| 1
| 4 November
| 
| W 3–2
| Chris Oxspring (1–0)
| Daniel McGrath (0–1)
| 
| 1,193
| 1–0
| 
|- bgcolor=#bbffbb
| 2
| 5 November (DH 1)
| 
| W 8–6
| Matthew Williams (1–0)
| Andrew Mann (0–1)
| Koo Dae-Sung (1)
| —
| 2–0
| 
|- bgcolor=#ffbbbb
| 3
| 5 November (DH 2)
| 
| L 13–9
| Blake Cunningham (1–0)
| Josh Wells (0–1)
| 
| 1,295
| 2–1
| 
|- bgcolor=#bbffbb
| 4
| 6 November
| 
| W 2–0
| Chris Oxspring (2–0)
| Sam Gibbons (0–1)
| 
| 1,425
| 3–1
| 
|- bgcolor=#bbffbb
| 5
| 10 November
| @ 
| W 6–4
| Craig Anderson (1–0)
| Simon Morriss (0–2)
| Koo Dae-Sung (2)
| 803
| 4–1
| 
|- bgcolor=#ffbbbb
| 6
| 11 November
| @ 
| L 10–0 (F/7)
| Alex Maestri (2–0)
| Wayne Lundgren (0–1)
| 
| 1,030
| 4–2
| 
|- bgcolor=#ffbbbb
| 7
| 12 November
| @ 
| L 2–0
| Yohei Yanagawa (1–0)
| Aiden Francis (0–1)
| Chris Mowday (2)
| 1,353
| 4–3
| 
|- bgcolor=#ffbbbb
| 8
| 13 November
| @ 
| L 2–1
| Chris Mowday (1–1)
| Chris Oxspring (2–1)
| 
| 640
| 4–4
| 
|-
| 9
| 17 November
| 
| –
| 
| 
| 
| 
| 
| 
|-
| 10
| 18 November (DH 1)
| 
| –
| 
| 
| 
| 
| 
| 
|-
| 11
| 18 November (DH 2)
| 
| –
| 
| 
| 
| 
| 
| 
|-
| 12
| 19 November
| 
| –
| 
| 
| 
| 
| 
| 
|-
| 13
| 24 November
| @ 
| –
| 
| 
| 
| 
| 
| 
|-
| 14
| 25 November
| @ 
| –
| 
| 
| 
| 
| 
| 
|-
| 15
| 26 November (DH 1)
| @ 
| –
| 
| 
| 
| 
| 
| 
|-
| 16
| 26 November (DH 2)
| @ 
| –
| 
| 
| 
| 
| 
| 
|-

|-
| 17
| 1 December
| 
| –
| 
| 
| 
| 
| 
| 
|-
| 18
| 2 December (DH 1)
| 
| –
| 
| 
| 
| 
| 
| 
|-
| 19
| 2 December (DH 2)
| 
| –
| 
| 
| 
| 
| 
| 
|-
| 20
| 3 December
| 
| –
| 
| 
| 
| 
| 
| 
|-
| 21
| 4 December
| 
| –
| 
| 
| 
| 
| 
| 
|-
| 22
| 15 December
| 
| –
| 
| 
| 
| 
| 
| 
|-
| 23
| 16 December
| 
| –
| 
| 
| 
| 
| 
| 
|-
| 24
| 17 December
| 
| –
| 
| 
| 
| 
| 
| 
|-
| 25
| 18 December
| 
| –
| 
| 
| 
| 
| 
| 
|-
| 26
| 29 December
| @ 
| –
| 
| 
| 
| 
| 
| 
|-
| 27
| 30 December
| @ 
| –
| 
| 
| 
| 
| 
| 
|-
| 28
| 31 December (DH 1)
| @ 
| –
| 
| 
| 
| 
| 
| 
|-
| 29
| 31 December (DH 2)
| @ 
| –
| 
| 
| 
| 
| 
| 
|-

|-
| 30
| 1 January
| @ 
| –
| 
| 
| 
| 
| 
| 
|-
| 31
| 5 January
| @ 
| –
| 
| 
| 
| 
| 
| 
|-
| 32
| 6 January
| @ 
| –
| 
| 
| 
| 
| 
| 
|-
| 33
| 7 January (DH 1)
| @ 
| –
| 
| 
| 
| 
| 
| 
|-
| 34
| 7 January (DH 2)
| @ 
| –
| 
| 
| 
| 
| 
| 
|-
| 35
| 8 January
| @ 
| –
| 
| 
| 
| 
| 
| 
|-
| 36
| 11 January
| 
| –
| 
| 
| 
| 
| 
| 
|-
| 37
| 12 January
| 
| –
| 
| 
| 
| 
| 
| 
|-
| 38
| 13 January
| 
| –
| 
| 
| 
| 
| 
| 
|-
| 39
| 14 January
| 
| –
| 
| 
| 
| 
| 
| 
|-
| 40
| 15 January
| 
| –
| 
| 
| 
| 
| 
| 
|-
| 41
| 18 January
| @ 
| –
| 
| 
| 
| 
| 
| 
|-
| 42
| 19 January
| @ 
| –
| 
| 
| 
| 
| 
| 
|-
| 43
| 20 January
| @ 
| –
| 
| 
| 
| 
| 
| 
|-
| 44
| 21 January
| @ 
| –
| 
| 
| 
| 
| 
| 
|-
| 45
| 22 January
| @ 
| –
| 
| 
| 
| 
| 
| 
|-

Roster

References 

Sydney Blue Sox
Sydney Blue Sox